Livaković is a Croatian surname. Notable people with the surname include:

Dominik Livaković (born 1995), Croatian footballer 
Nada Gačešić-Livaković (born 1951), Croatian actress

Croatian surnames
Slavic-language surnames
Patronymic surnames